Spyros Vallas (born 26 August 1981) is a Greek former professional footballer. Vallas, a defender, started his career at Skoda Xanthi, and transferred to Olympiacos in July 2003. He played for Larissa on loan for one season, 2006–2007. He returned to his first team, Skoda Xanthi, in July 2007. He was Young Player of the year in the 2002 season. On 26 September 2014, he announced his decision to retire from professional football.

Vallas competed for the Greece Olympic team at the 2004 Summer Olympics.

Honours

Olympiacos
Greek Super League: (2) : 2004–05, 2005–06
Greek Cup: (2) : 2004–05, 2005–06; Runner-up 2003–04

Larissa
Greek Cup: (1) : 2006–07

References

 

1981 births
Living people
People from Elassona
Greek footballers
Greece international footballers
Greece under-21 international footballers
Olympic footballers of Greece
Footballers at the 2004 Summer Olympics
Olympiacos F.C. players
Xanthi F.C. players
Athlitiki Enosi Larissa F.C. players
Super League Greece players
Association football defenders
Footballers from Thessaly